Frank James Calabrese Sr. (March 17, 1937 – December 25, 2012), also known as "Frankie Breeze", was a made man who ran major loansharking and illegal gambling operations for the Chicago Outfit. He is best known as a central figure in Operation Family Secrets and the subsequent federal trial. Calabrese, who was battling multiple ailments, died on Christmas Day 2012 at the Federal Medical Center, Butner, in North Carolina.

Early life 
Frank Calabrese Sr. was born in Chicago, Illinois on March 17, 1937, to James and Sophie Calabrese. Calabrese grew up on the West Side of Chicago, dropped out of school in the fourth grade and sold newspapers on Grand Avenue, he told jurors during a trial in 2007. He also told jurors that his family was so poor that they would eat oatmeal for dinner. Calabrese enlisted in the U.S. Army, however he went AWOL five days after boot camp.

Career in the mob 

Calabrese's arrest record dates from 1954, when he served two years in prison for a violation of the Dyer Act (auto theft). He was The Outfit's Chinatown, or 26th Street, crew boss who provided loans to hundreds of customers at exorbitant interest rates that varied from one percent to 10 percent per week. The federal government estimates that Calabrese's crew grossed more than $2,600,000. Calabrese instructed his crew members to, "do anything you have to do", to collect the loans. If a debtor did not have the money, the Calabrese crew would seize the debtor's car, home and business. Calabrese reported to Angelo J. LaPietra "The Hook", who was the ultimate boss of the 26th Street Crew and founder of the Italian American Club from where operations were handled.

At one point, Calabrese gained control of an auto repair shop in River Grove, Illinois, when the owner, Matthew Russo, fell behind on a loan. In 1990, Calabrese entered an agreement with a car dealership in Elmhurst, Illinois, to direct car repair work to this mob-controlled repair shop in exchange for kickbacks. However, Russo had become an undercover government informant and recorded the mobsters at one meeting at the dealership. Calabrese and eight of his crew members—sons Frank Calabrese Jr., and Kurt Calabrese, brother Nick Calabrese, Louis Bombacino, Philip Tolomeo, Kevin Kudulis, Terry Scalise and Philip Fiore— were eventually arrested.

1995 arrest and subsequent conviction 
On July 28, 1995, Calabrese, his brother, Nick, and two sons, Frank and Kurt, were all indicted by federal authorities and charged with using threats, violence, and intimidation to enforce their loansharking racket from 1978 until 1992.

On March 21, 1997, Calabrese and his sons pleaded guilty to the charges, just weeks before they were set to go to trial. "I'm very sad that this brings my kids into something that should never have happened", Calabrese told U.S. district judge James F. Holderman.

On October 15, 1997, Calabrese was sentenced by Holderman to 118 months in federal prison. He apologized to the court and his family for, "all the trouble I have caused."

Operation Family Secrets trial 
The investigation which led to the Family Secrets trial began when Calabrese's imprisoned son, Frank Jr., wrote to the FBI and volunteered to wear a wire on his father and uncle. He did not ask for sentence reduction or financial gain in exchange for doing it. Viewing this as a great opportunity, the FBI agreed to Frank Jr.'s proposal.

During their imprisonment, Frank Jr. recorded his father admitting to multiple murders. Faced with the evidence gathered by his nephew, Frank Sr.'s brother Nicholas Calabrese also agreed to testify against the Chicago Outfit.

On April 25, 2005, Frank Calabrese Sr. and a large number of high-profile Chicago Outfit gangsters were charged with murder, racketeering, extortion, and running an illegal gambling business as part of the federal-government initiated "Operation Family Secrets" investigation.

The Family Secrets trial began on June 19, 2007. Among the prosecution witnesses were Calabrese's brother, Nick Calabrese, and Frank Calabrese Sr's. son, Frank Calabrese Jr. An unusual aspect of the Family Secrets trial was that several members of the Chicago Outfit took the stand in their own defense. Calabrese testified on August 16, 2007, that he was not a "made" member of the Chicago Outfit, but he acknowledged that he put out street loans and that he paid a mob boss some of the proceeds.

On September 10, 2007, Calabrese and other Outfit defendants were convicted of a racketeering conspiracy that included murder, extortion, and loansharking. On September 11, 2007, during a court hearing to determine whether Calabrese and Vrchota were also guilty of various murders related to the case, Vrchota exclaimed, "Them are lies!" in response to a prosecutor's statement that Vrchota had left "a trail of bodies, literally." On September 27, 2007, jurors found that Vrchota had committed seven of the 18 murders in the indictment (of the 18 murders, Vrchota had been accused of taking part in 13 of them).

After the verdict, news came out that a juror had alleged that on August 27, 2007, Calabrese had said or mouthed, "You are a fucking dead man", to Prosecutor T. Markus Funk. On April 10, 2008, Judge James Zagel denied a request to order a new trial in the case, saying that he did not believe that the threat had tainted jurors. However, the threat resulted in Calabrese being placed in highly restrictive lockdown during his stay in the Metropolitan Correctional Center in Chicago while awaiting sentencing.

On January 28, 2009, Judge Zagel sentenced Calabrese, then 71, to life in prison for his crimes and called the acts he had committed, "unspeakable". On finding prosecutors had proven the murder allegations, the judge sentenced Calabrese for all 13 slayings.

Later criminal accusations 
On June 8, 2011, Calabrese was indicted on charges of conspiracy to defraud the United States and attempting to prevent seizure of Calabrese's property. The charges were announced the next morning by the U.S. Attorney's Office in Chicago. Calabrese was accused of plotting with a former prison chaplain to recover a violin hidden in a Wisconsin house.

Personal life and death 
Calabrese and his first wife, Dolores, divorced in 1984. He had four children: Frank Jr., Kurt, Nick, and Emmilio, by a long time Cuban mistress from New York by the name of Flor Sosa. During an interview, Kurt stated that the youngest Calabrese son, Nick, did not get involved with their father's criminal enterprise, presumably due to the age difference between Nick and his two elder brothers.

Calabrese resided in Oak Brook, Illinois, until his imprisonment in the mid-1990s.

Calabrese died at the age of 75, on December 25, 2012, at the Federal Medical Center, Butner, North Carolina. The Federal Bureau of Prisons did not release details for the cause of death.

References

External links 
 Mob hitman gets life in Family Secrets case Chicago Tribune
 Kass, John (January 29, 2009). "Mob boss' tale offers peek at city's 'secrets'", Chicago Tribune
 Associated Press, (September 11, 2007) "5 Guilty in Chicago Mob Case". New York Times
 Associated Press, (September 28, 2007) "MIDWEST; Illinois: Chicago Mobsters Responsible For Murders". New York Times
 Davey, Monica (July 10, 2007). Memories of a Mob Past Are Dusted Off for a Trial New York Times
 IPSN: Illinois Police & Sheriff's News: Calabrese Street Crew Cops a Plea  Illinois Police and Sheriff's News

1937 births
2012 deaths
20th-century criminals
American gangsters of Italian descent
American people convicted of murder
Chicago Outfit mobsters
People convicted of racketeering
People from Oak Brook, Illinois